Seto Durbar (White Palace) was a Rana palace in Kathmandu, the capital of Nepal. The palace complex, located south of the Narayanhity Palace, was incorporated in an impressive and vast array of courtyards, furnishings and guest halls. Seto Durbar was built by Bir Shumsher Jung Bahadur Rana in 1893 CE.

History

Seto Durbar was built by Bir Shumsher JBR in 1893 CE in a land area of 375 ropani with Lal Durbar to its northeast as his private residence. In 1901 Gehendra Shamsher JBR, Bir Shumsher JBR's eldest son inherited this palace. In 1905 upon Gahendra's death his son Lila Shumsher inherited Seto Durbar.

Grand State Hall
Seto durbar was famous for its Grand State Hall known as Thulo Baithak or Big hall. This Grand State Hall was famous for its Belgian wall mirrors; glass lamps from Murano and Bohemian chandeliers adorned the interiors while Italian marble tiled the floors.

Destruction of the Seto Durbar
In 1934 a massive fire broke out at Seto Durbar engulfing the palace building. Historian Purushottam Shamsher says in his book that Lila Shumsher begged the then Prime Minister Juddha Shumsher to use artillery cannon to cut off the burning wing from the non-affected wing. Juddha Shumsher declined his begging saying artillery might damage Narayanhiti Palace, the Royal residence of the King. Today, the only remains of Seto durbar is a building occupied by NIDC Development Bank Head Office in Durbar Marg.

Legacy
Seto Durbar is considered by historians as one of the most beautiful and extravagant palace buildings in the history of Nepal. Today most of the Hotel Annapurna stands on the grounds of Seto Durbar

See also

 Bhimsen Thapa
 Jung Bahadur Rana 
 Mathabarsingh Thapa

References

Rana palaces of Nepal
Palaces in Kathmandu
19th-century establishments in Nepal